Jean-Pierre Hubert (May 25, 1941 in Strasbourg – May 1, 2006 in Wissembourg) was a science fiction and detective fiction author. He won the Prix Rosny-Aîné several times and has been reviewed by Locus (magazine).

Bibliography
 Planète à trois temps, Opta, 1975
 Mort à l'étouffée, Kesselring, 1978
 Couple de scorpions, Kesselring, 1980
 Scènes de guerre civile, Opta, 1982
 Le champ du rêveur, Denoël, 1983 (Prix Rosny-Aîné winner)
 Séméla, Plasma, 1983
 Les faiseurs d'orage, Denoël, 1984
 Ombromanies, Denoël, 1985 (Prix Rosny-Aîné winner) 1986
 Cocktail, Patrick Siry, 1988.
 Le bleu des mondes, Hachette Jeunesse, 1997
 Je suis la mort, Fleuve Noir, 1998
 Les cendres de Ligna, Mango Jeunesse, 2000
 Le lac des grimaces, Degliame, 2001
 Sa majesté des clones, Mango Jeunesse, 2002
 Les sonneurs noirs, Mango Jeunesse, 2004
 Sur les pistes de Scar, Mango Jeunesse, 2005

Notes

External links
Noosfere (In French)

1941 births
2006 deaths
Writers from Strasbourg
French science fiction writers
French male novelists
20th-century French novelists
20th-century French male writers